Sandy Collins may refer to:

Sandy Collins (politician), member of the Newfoundland and Labrador House of Assembly
Sandy Collins (tennis), US tennis player

See also
Alexander Collins (disambiguation)